Marquiz de Alba is a village located in the province of Zamora, Castile and León, Spain. According to the 2020 census (INE), the village had a population of 59 inhabitants.

Town hall
Olmillos de Castro is home to the town hall of 4 villages:
San Martín de Tábara (72 inhabitants, INE 2020).
Olmillos de Castro (63 inhabitants, INE 2020).
Marquiz de Alba (59 inhabitants, INE 2020).
Navianos de Alba (18 inhabitants, INE 2020).

References

Municipalities of the Province of Zamora